Lady Stay Dead is a 1981 Australian thriller film directed by Terry Bourke about a psychotic handyman.

Plot
Gordon Mason (Chard Hayward) works as a handyman at the Rocky Beach Motel. Mason proceeds to spy on Marie Coleby (Deborah Coulls), who is bad tempered, bossy and constantly barks orders at and berates Mason all day. Later that day, when she packs up to drive to the airport to pick up her sister, Jenny (Louise Howitt), Mason intrudes on her, plays one of her songs on the radio ("Loving from a Distance") and rapes her. After Marie bites Mason and calls him an animal, he drowns Marie in her fish tank in a fit of rage. While trying to hide her body in a garbage bag, her neighbour Billy Sheperd (Les Foxcroft) catches him in the act and is also killed by Mason, who also poisons Billy's dog.

Later, Jenny is driven home from the airport and finds the house empty. She later finds Marie's jewels from her necklace in the fish tank and even finds Billy's dog floating in the water at the beach. She tries to tell Billy but sees his body lying on the couch and mistakes him for merely napping. Jenny tries making a few phone calls to find Marie and even tries calling Billy later, but receives no answer. She then meets Mason, whom she draws suspicion towards due to his knowledge of the house, which are later confirmed by sundown when she finds a muddy footprint on the carpet that was attempted to be cleaned off. She runs back to Billy's house to get help from him only to find his body hidden in his garden shed. She runs back to the motel to call the police only to find Mason there waiting for her, dressed in a suit with presents for her.

Mason cuts the phone wire while she calls the coastal guard service. Mason then proceeds to taunt Jenny and whistles "Loving from a Distance" every now and then. He also tries to break into the house to no avail. Two policemen arrive shortly, officer Clyde Collings (Roger Ward) and patrolman Rex "Pops" Dunbar (James Elliott), but Pops is killed by Mason with a shotgun from the cop car when Pops tries to radio for backup. Collings reveals to Jenny that Mason has a history of raping other women who never laid charges on him because of their "irate husbands". He then tells Jenny to make a run for the highway since Mason won't see her in the dark, but she stops when she finds Marie's body in the backyard and mourns over her. Collings tries to strike a deal with Mason, who refuses, but Collings vows to kill Mason after he sets his partner (who survived the gunshot) on fire. Collings chases Mason and fights him in the swimming pool and eventually drowns Mason.

Jenny, who eventually ran out and hid in the bushes on the highway, comes out of hiding when Collings' car drives by and orders her to come out. It's revealed that Mason survived his drowning and killed Collings. He proceeds to strangle her, but envisions Marie in her place and has a mental breakdown. Mason is then hit by a passing motorcyclist and is thrown into Collings' car. Another cop car drives by and the two officers inside find Jenny lying on the road. One of them inspects Collings' car and finds a barely conscious Mason inside about to shoot him with the shotgun, but that officer shoots and kills Mason.

Cast
Chard Hayward as Gordon Mason
Louise Howitt as Jenny Nolan
Deborah Coulls as Marie Coleby
Roger Ward as Officer Clyde Collings
James Elliott as Patrolman Rex "Pops" Dunbar
Les Foxcroft as Billy Sheperd

Production
The film was shot in Palm Beach, Sydney.

Accolades
Terry Bourke won a Fantafestival Award for Best Thriller for his work on Lady Stay Dead.

See also
List of films featuring home invasions
The Plumber, a similarly-themed Australian film released around the same time

References

External links
Lady Stay Dead at IMDb
Lady Stay Dead at Oz Movies

1981 films
1981 horror films
1981 thriller films
Australian thriller films
Films shot in Sydney
Films about rape
1980s English-language films
Films directed by Terry Bourke